The Luncavița is a left tributary of the river Mehadica in Romania. It flows into the Mehadica in Crușovăț.

References

Rivers of Romania
Rivers of Caraș-Severin County